Linwood is a hamlet in the New Forest National Park of Hampshire, England. Its nearest town is Ringwood, which lies approximately 4.2 miles (5.9 km) south-west from the village. It is in the civil parish of Ellingham, Harbridge and Ibsley. The village has one pub, named the Red Shoot Inn and a camping park, named the Red Shoot Camping Park.

The wildlife film maker Eric Ashby lived at Linwood from 1953 until his death in 2003.

References

External links

Hamlets in Hampshire